A God That Can Dance is the second and final studio album from Los Angeles-based musician Paul Delph, released privately in 1996 and officially in 2003.

Background
A God That Can Dance was privately released to family and friends in 1996. It chronicles Delph's struggle with HIV/AIDS and draws its title from a quote attributed in the liner notes to Friedrich Nietzsche (1844 – 1900):

"I would believe only in a God that knew how to dance." — Thus Spoke Zarathustra

Writing and recording
The album was produced by Delph and Paul Marcus, who also wrote the majority of the material together. The album was engineered by Delph and Jim McMahon. It was recorded at Magic Bus Studio, Magic Studio, and The Aspen Studio, and mastered by Wally Traugott at Capitol Mastering, California.

Both "Eternity Spin" and "The Dance at the End of Time" was written by American singer-songwriter Jimmie Spheeris. In 1983-4, he returned to the studio to record a new album that was produced by Delph, however he was killed by a drunken driver in 1984. The album, titled Spheeris, wasn't released commercially until 2000. In "Mad at God", the second verse speaks of Spheeris, where Delph questions whether his "best friend had to die", relating to the fatal motorcycle crash Spheeris was involved with. "Breath of Life" features vocal from singer and friend Vida Vierra. "Mama Don't Cry" is directed to Delph's parents. "Kyrie" was written by Medieval French poet and composer Guillaume de Machaut. "Let Yourself Go" was later used in the final scene of the 1999 US romantic comedy film Deal of a Lifetime.

In 2003, to promote the release of the album, a radio broadcast on KOOP FM 91.7 in Austin, Texas, featured album personnel Paul Marcus, Vida Vierra, Doug Lunn and Andy Markley. Marcus commented: "Paul and I worked closely on the album, we'd been writing songs for about fifteen years, and he found out he was HIV positive and then finally told me. Slowly but surely we started writing these songs that were sort of a song cycle, and we didn't really realise that until about half way through, but it was basically documenting what he went through and what we were going through. It was very exciting, incredibly sad, and always powerful - what had happened - all the recording that went on during the sessions. Most of it happened in this Magic Bus, somebody had left a 24-track recording studio on a bus in Malibu, and said Paul, here you can use this." Recalling "Mama Don't Cry", Marcus said: "I remember when he wrote "Mama Don't Cry", it came out of a conversation where I said 'you gotta tell your folks, you've got to tell them', if he wanted to protect them as he's a sweet guy who doesn't want anyone to hurt. And he did, and one of his ways of telling his mother was to write the song."Three days after Delph's death, his mother, June, published a letter based on Paul's final week. She said: "Throughout the week, we played music for Paul - "A God That Can Dance," and in particular, "Breath of Life," also Jimmie Spheeris' CD that Paul put together of Jimmie's renditions of favorite songs."

Official release
Growing interest in Delph's legacy later caused the album to be officially released on CD in 2003. It was digitally remastered and featured new artwork designed by Billy Vaughn, with inserts containing all the lyrics, credits and updated biography information. All sales of the album were to benefit the Paul Delph Memorial Scholarship Fund. After the album's release, five additional Paul Delph collections were to follow, but these have not yet appeared.

Marcus said of the release: "It just had to be done, it's astonishing work, it's an amazing album. There's an incredible lineup of musicians, the material is just stunning, it was languishing and it needed to be documented, preserved and made available to a new generation of listeners."

Track listing

Critical reception

Will Grega of AllMusic'' said: 

David McClanahan wrote:

Personnel
 Paul Delph - vocals, keyboards, producer, engineer
 Paul Marcus - guitar, keyboards, backing vocals, producer
 John Goodsall, Rick Blair, Dave Fisk, Jonathan McEuen - guitar
 Doug Lunn - bass
 Doug Webb - saxophone
 David Mendez - percussion
 MeHi Manoliu - clay pot
 Vida Vierra - backing vocals
 Andy Markley - sampled vocals, art direction, digital imaging
 Jim McMahon - engineer
 Wally Traugott - mastering
 Billy Vaughn - cover photo
 Lee Varis - inner sleeve photo
 WCB Graphics (Bill Beckman and Jim Long) - graphic support

References

1996 albums
2003 albums
Rock albums by American artists
Pop rock albums by American artists